The Province of Vicenza is a province in the Veneto region in northern Italy. Its capital city is Vicenza.

The province has an area of 2,722.53 km², and a total population of 865,082 (as of 2017). There are 199 comuni (municipalities) in the province. Towns in the province include Bassano del Grappa, Schio, Arzignano, Montecchio Maggiore, Thiene, Torri di Quartesolo, Noventa Vicentina, Marostica, Lonigo and Valdagno.
 
Population is unevenly spread throughout the province. More than 60% of the populace resides in densely industrialised areas in the eastern, western, and northern (known as Alto Vicentino) conurbations, as well as the area surrounding Bassano del Grappa. The remaining 40% reside in predominantly rural areas in the southern part of the province (the Colli Berici and Basso Vicentino) or the Asiago plateau.

Economic development in some areas is hindered by industrial and agricultural depression. Towns in the western section such as Valdagno and Montecchio Maggiore suffer from high unemployment, following a decline in steel and textile industries. The Colli Berici and Basso Vicentino remain overwhelmingly agricultural and present high levels of unemployment. The heavily industrial Alto Vicentino area alone accounts for half of the province's GDP.

Federico Faggin, an Italian physicist/electrical engineer principally responsible for the design of the first microprocessor, was born in Vicenza.

Comunes 
There were 116 comuni (singular: comune) in the province (dati: Istat 01/01/2018):

 Agugliaro
 Albettone
 Alonte
 Altavilla Vicentina
 Altissimo
 Arcugnano
 Arsiero
 Arzignano
 Asiago
 Asigliano Veneto
 Barbarano Mossano
 Bassano del Grappa
 Bolzano Vicentino
 Breganze
 Brendola
 Bressanvido
 Brogliano
 Caldogno
 Caltrano
 Calvene
 Camisano Vicentino
 Campiglia dei Berici
 Carrè
 Cartigliano
 Cassola
 Castegnero
 Castelgomberto
 Chiampo
 Chiuppano
 Cogollo del Cengio
 Colceresa
 Cornedo Vicentino
 Costabissara
 Creazzo
 Crespadoro
 Dueville
 Enego
 Fara Vicentino
 Foza
 Gallio
 Gambellara
 Gambugliano
 Grisignano di Zocco
 Grumolo delle Abbadesse
 Isola Vicentina
 Laghi
 Lastebasse
 Longare
 Lonigo
 Lugo di Vicenza
 Lusiana Conco
 Malo
 Marano Vicentino
 Marostica
 Monte di Malo
 Montebello Vicentino
 Montecchio Maggiore
 Montecchio Precalcino
 Montegalda
 Montegaldella
 Monteviale
 Monticello Conte Otto
 Montorso Vicentino
 Mussolente
 Nanto
 Nogarole Vicentino
 Nove
 Noventa Vicentina
 Orgiano
 Pedemonte
 Pianezze
 Piovene Rocchette
 Pojana Maggiore
 Posina
 Pove del Grappa
 Pozzoleone
 Quinto Vicentino
 Recoaro Terme
 Roana
 Romano d'Ezzelino
 Rossano Veneto
 Rosà
 Rotzo
 Salcedo
 San Pietro Mussolino
 San Vito di Leguzzano
 Sandrigo
 Santorso
 Sarcedo
 Sarego
 Schiavon
 Schio
 Solagna
 Sossano
 Sovizzo
 Tezze sul Brenta
 Thiene
 Tonezza del Cimone
 Torrebelvicino
 Torri di Quartesolo
 Trissino
 Valbrenta
 Valdagno
 Valdastico
 Valli del Pasubio
 Val Liona
 Velo d'Astico
 Vicenza
 Villaga
 Villaverla
 Zanè
 Zermeghedo
 Zovencedo
 Zugliano

Economy
The industrial sector plays a primary role and over the last half century has supplanted the predominant agricultural sector: since the second post-war period, the province has in fact been one of the major interpreters of the remarkable economic and industrial development of the North-East of Italy. The most important economic activities in the province are textile, tanning, marble extraction, ceramics, furniture, but above all jewelry.

Small and medium-sized enterprises predominate on the territory, making the province of Vicenza one of the most important on a national level, and which have developed, giving rise to mainly 4 industrial districts:

 The leather district in the Chiampo Valley, in Arzignano, Chiampo, Montorso Vicentino, Zermeghedo and Montebello Vicentino,
 The wool and yarn district in the towns of Schio and Valdagno (historically linked to the two large local industries, Lanerossi and Marzotto respectively)
 The goldsmith district in Vicenza, Trissino and Camisano Vicentino
 The electronics district in Vicenza

Other activities typically linked to the territory are:

 The distilleries in Bassano del Grappa, considered the world capital of grappa
 The furniture factories in Bassano del Grappa
 The production of ceramics in Nove and Vicenza.

See also
 Calà del Sasso
 Strada delle 52 Gallerie
 Stele of Isola Vicentina

References

External links
  

 Guide to Outdoor Activities in the Vicenza Province

 
Vicenza